The men's freestyle 70 kg is a competition featured at the 2017 Russian National Freestyle Wrestling Championships, and was held in Nazran, Ingushetia, Russia on June 12.

Medalists

Results
Legend
F — Won by fall
WO — Won by walkover

Finals

Top half

Section 1

Section 2

Bottom half

Section 3

Section 4

Repechage

References

https://pp.userapi.com/c837335/v837335764/4902c/FYlmyWM1Nrg.jpg

Men's freestyle 70 kg